Notre Dame de Lorette is a military cemetery in France.

Notre Dame de Lorette may also refer to:

Notre-Dame-de-Lorette (Paris Métro), a station on the Paris Métro
Notre-Dame-de-Lorette, Paris, a church in Paris
Notre-Dame-de-Lorette, Quebec, a municipality in Quebec, Canada
Notre Dame de Lorette, a church in Lorette, Manitoba, Canada